German submarine U-341 was a Type VIIC U-boat of Nazi Germany's Kriegsmarine during World War II.

She did not sink or damage any ships.

Design
German Type VIIC submarines were preceded by the shorter Type VIIB submarines. U-341 had a displacement of  when at the surface and  while submerged. She had two shafts and two  propellers.

U-341 was fitted with five  torpedo tubes (four fitted at the bow and one at the stern), fourteen torpedoes, one  SK C/35 naval gun, 220 rounds, and two twin  C/30 anti-aircraft guns. The boat had a complement of between forty-four and sixty.

Service history
The submarine was laid down on 28 October 1941 at the Nordseewerke yard at Emden as yard number 213, launched on 10 October 1942 and commissioned on 28 November 1942 under the command of Oberleutnant zur See Dietrich Epp.

U-341 served with the 8th U-boat Flotilla, for training and then with the 3rd flotilla for operations from 1 June.

First patrol
U-341 sailed from Kiel on 25 May 1943, and out into the Atlantic Ocean via the Iceland / Faroe Islands gap. Having moved all over the central north Atlantic without encountering any shipping, she arrived at La Pallice in occupied France, on 10 July.

Second patrol and loss
For her second foray, U-341 departed La Pallice on 31 August 1943 and headed north. On 19 September, she was sunk by depth charges dropped by a Canadian B-24 Liberator of No. 10 Squadron RCAF southwest of Iceland.

Fifty men died; there were no survivors

Wolfpacks
U-341 took part in one wolfpack, namely:
 Leuthen (15 – 19 September 1943)

References

Bibliography

External links
 

German Type VIIC submarines
U-boats commissioned in 1942
U-boats sunk in 1943
U-boats sunk by Canadian aircraft
U-boats sunk by depth charges
World War II submarines of Germany
World War II shipwrecks in the Atlantic Ocean
1942 ships
Ships built in Emden
Ships lost with all hands
Maritime incidents in September 1943